Darnell Lazare (born January 29, 1985) is an American former professional basketball player currently working as a player development coach for the New Orleans Pelicans of the National Basketball Association (NBA). He played college basketball for LSU.

High school career
Lazare played his high school basketball for coach Kenny Almond at Woodlawn High School, Baton Rouge, Louisiana. Lazare averaged 15 points and 10 rebounds in his final year at Woodlawn, and won back-to-back basketball state championships at Woodlawn in his junior and senior seasons. Lazare was a two-year member of the Louisiana Sports Writers Association All-State team, two-year member of the Advocate's All-Metro team and three-year All-District honoree.

College career
Lazare averaged just over 12 minutes a game in his freshman season at Louisiana State University. He played in all 29 games, starting eight of them. He averaged 2.9 points and 2.4 rebounds per game.

In his sophomore season, he played in 25 games (no starts), averaging 2.0 points and 1.2 rebounds per game.

In his junior season, he played in 36 games (15 starts), averaging 6.7 points and 3.4 rebounds per game.

In his senior season, he played in 30 games (25 starts), averaging 7.4 points and 4.5 rebounds per game.

Professional career
Lazare went undrafted in the 2007 NBA draft. He later signed with Stal Ostrów Wielkopolski of Poland but left after pre-season. He then moved to Gothia Basket of Sweden for the 2007–08 season.

In 2008, he signed with Dnipro Dnipropetrovsk of the Ukraine for the 2008–09 season.

In November 2009, he was acquired by the Maine Red Claws. During the 2009–10 season, Lazare averaged 10.5 points and 5.4 rebounds in 27 minutes per game in 50 games.

In November 2010, his rights were traded to the Fort Wayne Mad Ants for a second round pick. In November 2011, he was re-acquired by the Mad Ants. On December 10, 2011, he signed with the Indiana Pacers. However, he was later waived by the Pacers on December 23, 2011. He then returned to the Mad Ants.

On July 9, 2012, Lazare signed with the Sydney Kings for the 2012–13 NBL season. Lazare had a successful season with the Kings, being named the starting power forward for the North All-Star team. He scored a season high 25 points against the New Zealand Breakers on February 9, 2013.

On June 6, 2013, Lazare signed with the New Zealand Breakers for the 2013–14 NBL season. On October 28, 2013, Lazare was released by the Breakers just four games into the season.

On January 3, 2014, he was re-acquired by the Fort Wayne Mad Ants. On February 26, 2014, he was traded to the Idaho Stampede.

In 2015, he signed with the London Lightning of the National Basketball League of Canada. In July 2015, he joined the Memphis Grizzlies summer league roster.

Coaching career
At the end of the 2014–2015 season, Lazare joined the Iowa Energy of the NBA Development League as an assistant coach.

After a year as a player development coach and assistant video coordinator for the Memphis Grizzlies, Lazare was hired by the New Orleans Pelicans as a player development coach prior to the 2019–20 NBA season and was brought back the following season.

References

External links
Profile at Eurobasket.com
Profile at andthefoul.net

1985 births
Living people
American expatriate basketball people in Australia
American expatriate basketball people in Canada
American expatriate basketball people in Sweden
American expatriate basketball people in Ukraine
Basketball players from Louisiana
BC Dnipro players
Fort Wayne Mad Ants players
Idaho Stampede players
LSU Tigers basketball players
Maine Red Claws players
Memphis Grizzlies assistant coaches
New Zealand Breakers players
Power forwards (basketball)
Sportspeople from Lafayette, Louisiana
Sydney Kings players
American men's basketball players